Luellen is a surname. Notable people with the surname include:

Joshua Howard Luellen (born 1989), professionally known as Southside, American record producer, songwriter, and rapper
Tyler Luellen (born 1984), American football player

See also
Lewellen (surname), another surname